Ikwerre, sometimes spelt as Ikwere, is a type of Igboid language spoken primarily by the Ikwerre people, who inhabit certain areas of Rivers State, Nigeria. It is the biggest Igboid variety along with Ngwa of Abia State.

Classification 
The Ikwerre language is classified as an Igboid language. Based on lexicostatistical analysis, Kay Williamson first asserted that the Ikwerre, Ekpeye, Ogba, Etche and Igbo languages belonged to the same language cluster, and were not dialects. However after subsequent studies and more research by both Williamson and Roger Blench, it was concluded that Igbo, Ikwerre, Ogba and their sister languages apart from Ekpeye form a "language cluster" and that they are somewhat mutually intelligible.  There are indications that the Ikwerre society was bilingual even in the pre-colonial Nigeria, with people speaking Igbo dialects, as well as the Ikwerre language.

Phonology

Vowels
Ikwerre distinguishes vowels by quality (frontedness and height), the presence or absence of nasalization, and the presence or absence of advanced tongue root.

There is also a vowel * which is posited to explain syllabic nasal consonants in accounts of the language which state that Ikwerre has no nasal stops.

Vowel harmony
Ikwerre exhibits two kinds of vowel harmony:
Every vowel in an Ikwerre word, with a few exceptions, agrees with the other vowels in the word as to the presence or absence of advanced tongue root.
Vowels of the same height in adjacent syllables must all be either front or back, i.e. the pairs  & ,  & ,  & , and  &  cannot occur in adjacent syllables. Vowels of different heights, however, need not match for frontness/backness either.

Consonants

The oral consonants  occur before oral vowels, and their nasal allophones  before nasal vowels. The "non-explosive stops"  are not plosives (not pulmonic), and are equivalent to implosives in other varieties of Igbo.

The tap  may sometimes be realized as an approximant .

Tone

Ikwerre is a tonal language with seven tones: high, mid, low, high-low falling, high-mid falling, mid-low falling and rising. Ikwerre also has a tonal downdrift. For example: 
rínyā̀ (high, mid-low falling) means "weight, heaviness",
rìnyâ (low,high-low falling) means "female, wife",
mụ̌ (rising) means "to learn",
mụ̂ (high-low falling) means "to give birth", etc.

Agbirigba
Ikwerre has an in-group variant, or cant, Agbirigba, that is meant to prevent understanding by outsiders.

References

Igboid languages
Languages of Nigeria
Indigenous languages of Rivers State